Raphael II was Ecumenical Patriarch of Constantinople from 1603 to 1607.

Life
Raphael was Bishop of Mithymna when, in March 1603, he was elected Ecumenical Patriarch. During his patriarchate, he addressed the regulation of many ecclesiastical matters and issued a number of standard provisions. The clashes with the previous Patriarch Neophytus II caused many problems in the Church, to the point that Cyril Lucaris, in a letter to the Bishop of Heraclea Dionysius, wrote that "... Raphael ruled the Patriarchate as a tyrant for more than four years ...".

Raphael showed interest in a possible union with the Western Church and he began a secret correspondence with the Pope. He remained Patriarch until October 1607, when he was forcibly deposed by Sultan Ahmed I and suffered a violent death in exile.

Notes

17th-century Ecumenical Patriarchs of Constantinople
17th-century Greek clergy